Walmul is a rural locality in the Rockhampton Region, Queensland, Australia.

Geography 
Walmul railway station is an abandoned railway station on the former Dawson Valley railway line.

History 
The locality takes its name from its former railway station, assigned on 18 November 1911. It is believed to be an Aboriginal word meaning koala. 

Walmul State School opened in 1927. It closed in 1930.

Education 
There are no schools in Walmul. The nearest government primary and secondary schools are Mount Morgan State School and Mount Morgan State High School, both in Mount Morgan to the north.

References 

Suburbs of Rockhampton Region
Localities in Queensland